Capital punishment has been completely abolished in all European countries except for Belarus and Russia, the latter of which has a moratorium and has not conducted an execution since September 1996. The complete ban on capital punishment is enshrined in both the Charter of Fundamental Rights of the European Union (EU) and two widely adopted protocols of the European Convention on Human Rights of the Council of Europe, and is thus considered a central value. Of all modern European countries, San Marino, Portugal, and the Netherlands were the first to abolish capital punishment, whereas only Belarus still practises capital punishment in some form or another. In 2012, Latvia became the last EU member state to abolish capital punishment in wartime.

In Russia, capital punishment has been indefinitely suspended (under moratorium) since 1996.

Except for Belarus, which, most recently, carried out one execution in 2021, the last execution occurred in Ukraine in 1997.

Abolition

Legal instruments in Europe
The Council of Europe has two main instruments against capital punishment: Protocol 6 and Protocol 13.

Protocol 6, opened for signing in 1983, which prohibits capital punishment during peacetime has been ratified by all members of the Council of Europe, except Russia (which has signed, but not ratified).

Protocol 13, opened for signing in 2002, prohibits capital punishment in all circumstances. All member states of the Council of Europe have ratified it, except Azerbaijan and Russia (the later was eventually expelled from the organization due to its 2022 invasion of Ukraine), which have not signed it, and Armenia, which has signed but not yet ratified. Armenia and Azerbaijan have abolished capital punishment. Poland is the latest country to ratify Protocol 13 in May 2014.

The 21st century
The only country in Europe that continues to execute in the 21st century is Belarus (last execution done in 2021).

No member of the Council of Europe has carried out executions in the 21st century. The last execution on the present day territory of the Council of Europe took place in 1997 in Ukraine.

History
Abolition has been common in European history, but has only been a real trend since the end of the Second World War when human rights became a particular priority. The Kingdom of Italy had abolished the death penalty for civilians with the adoption of the Zanardelli Penal Code of 1889, but the Fascists had reintroduced it with the 1930 Penal Code.

The European Convention on Human Rights was adopted in 1950, but some countries took many years to ratify it. The United Kingdom retained the death penalty for high treason until 1998; however, this technicality was superseded by the absolute ban on the death penalty in 1976. William Joyce was the last person to be put to death for high treason in the UK, on 3 January 1946 at Wandsworth Prison.

A moratorium on the death penalty has been in place in Russia since 1 January 2010. According to the 19 November 2009 decision of the Constitutional Court of the Russian Federation, the death penalty shall not be practiced in Russia at any time before the ratification of the above-mentioned protocol. The Constitutional Court has also clarified that the decision is not an extension of the moratorium but the abolition of the capital punishment, since it will be no longer possible to practice it legally.

2009 was the first year that no one was executed anywhere in Europe, however in March 2010, Belarus executed the last two people on its death row.

The European Union has long since been opposed to the death penalty, supporting the European Convention, and its 2000 Charter of Fundamental Rights included an absolute ban on the death penalty in all circumstances. The Charter has been made legally binding by the Treaty of Lisbon as it was fully ratified and became effective on 1 December 2009. The treaty also has a provision for the EU to join the Council of Europe and accede to the European Convention on Human Rights. The EU has been an active promoter of abolition worldwide and has been promoting a United Nations moratorium on the death penalty; however some EU member state such as Poland have opposed such moves. The only member state to have performed executions in Europe whilst a Member of the EU or EEC is France, last shooting a prisoner in 1963 and last beheading one with the guillotine in 1977. The death penalty was abolished in France in 1981. All other states had effectively abolished Capital Punishment before joining the EU, at least in their metropolitan European Territory. Two hangings were carried out later in 1977 in a Bermuda, a Special Territory of the EU as a UK Overseas Territory, (after the UK joined the EC in 1973). Due to later abolition dates in countries that joined later, there have been more recent executions in places that are now part of the EU, the most recent example being Latvia which shot a prisoner in 1996.

The Council of Europe has made abolition of the death penalty a prerequisite for membership. As a result, no execution has taken place on the territory of the organisation's member states since 1997. The Parliamentary Assembly of the Council of Europe continues to monitor the capital punishment issue. The current General Rapporteur on the abolition of the death penalty for the Parliamentary Assembly is German Member of Parliament Marina Schuster.

Only used once, at the very last execution in Sweden

Former countries

Belarus

The only European country that executes criminals is Belarus, as that country is not part of the European Convention on Human Rights. Executions in Belarus are carried out by shooting.

Russia

Capital punishment in Russia has been indefinitely suspended, although it still remains codified in its law. There exists both an implicit moratorium established by the President Yeltsin in 1996, and an explicit one, established by the Constitutional Court of Russia in 1999 and which was most recently reaffirmed in 2009. Russia has not executed anyone in the Russian Federation since August or September 1996 (except one in 1999 in the Chechen Republic, a former limited recognition state). However, Russia was suspended from the Council of Europe in the wake of its 2022 invasion of Ukraine, and subsequently announced its intention to withdraw from the organization before being effectively exepelled, former President and Prime Minister Dmitry Medvedev endorsed restoring death penalty in Russia.

Bosnia and Herzegovina

The death penalty in Bosnia and Herzegovina has been constitutionally abolished since 1995. However, it was only on 4 October 2019 that the capital punishment was completely erased from the Constitution of Republika Srpska, one of Bosnia and Herzegovina's two entities. While it was still in place, it was endorsed under Article 11 of the Constitution of Republika Srpska.

Separatist territories and partially recognized jurisdictions 
In Europe there are also partially unrecognized states. In 2006, the Parliamentary Assembly of the Council of Europe wrote that: While Artsakh abolished the death penalty on 1 August 2003, when it decided to implement the Republic of Armenia's new Criminal Code on its territory, the other territories, Abkhazia, Transnistria and South Ossetia, have not done so, retaining capital punishment in their legislation both in peacetime and in wartime. As South Ossetia decided in 1992 to make Russian legislation applicable on its territory, it has observed a moratorium on executions since 1996. The death penalty is in the Transnistrian Criminal Code which came into force in 2002. In July 1999, de facto President Smirnov ordered a moratorium on executions, and there is said to be only one prisoner on death row in Transnistria. Abkhazia formalized its moratorium in 2007, moving towards full abolition. On 12 January 2007 the parliament of Abkhazia adopted a law entitled "Moratorium on the Death Penalty", establishing a moratorium on executions during peacetime. Since 1993 the country has had a de facto moratorium on executions. Although there have been 10 sentences of death in Abkhazia, these have never been implemented.

The Turkish Republic of Northern Cyprus retains the death penalty only for crimes committed under special circumstances (war crimes). See also Capital punishment in Cyprus.

There is no death penalty in Kosovo.

The Donetsk People's Republic introduced the death penalty in 2014 for cases of treason, espionage, and assassination of political leaders. There had already been accusations of extrajudicial execution occurring.

The Luhansk People's Republic introduced the death penalty on 26 September 2014 in cases of homosexual rape.

See also
 Use of capital punishment by country
 Capital punishment abolitionism
 European Court of Human Rights

References

External links
 Amnesty International – Abolitionist and Retentionist Countries
 Amnesty International – Ratification of International Treaties

Capital punishment
Politics of Europe
Law enforcement in Europe
Human rights in Europe